Renk is a German industrial company.

Renk may also refer to:

People
 Merry Renk (1921–2012), American jewelry designer, metalsmith, sculptor and painter
 Silke Renk (born 1967), German retired javelin thrower

Places
 Renk County, Upper Nile State, South Sudan
 Renk, South Sudan, a town
 Renk Airport, an airport serving Renk